Dustabad (also Romanized as Dūstābād; also known as Deh Jūqeh and Dojegheh Dūstāqād) is a village in Bagh Safa Rural District, Sarchehan District, Bavanat County, Fars Province, Iran. At the 2006 census, its population was 311, in 73 families.

References 

Populated places in Sarchehan County